Mark Kielesz-Levine (born 1985) is a British Polish television reporter and presenter. He currently works at ITV Central in the Midlands.

Originally from Leeds in West Yorkshire, Kielesz-Levine started his journalism career following a postgraduate diploma at Leeds Trinity University, after completing an undergraduate degree at Newcastle University and a master's degree at the University of Leeds.

He first worked for the Global radio network brand before moving to local television and Leeds TV where he would become the lead news and sport presenter for Leeds and then across the whole network.

Kielesz-Levine has been nominated for both Royal Television Society and O2 Journalism awards, winning the Reporter of the Year Award for Yorkshire in 2017 He has worked for ITV Central since August 2019.

References

Alumni of Leeds Trinity University
Alumni of the University of Leeds
Alumni of Newcastle University
Living people
English television presenters
English television journalists
ITV regional newsreaders and journalists
1985 births